In the field of microbiome research, a group of species is said to show a phylosymbiotic signal if the degree of similarity between the species' microbiomes recapitulates to a significant extent their evolutionary history.
In other words, a phylosymbiotic signal among a group of species is evident if their microbiome similarity dendrogram could prove to have significant similarities with their host's phylogenic tree. For the analysis of the phylosymbiotic signal to be reliable, environmental differences
that could shape the host microbiome should be either eliminated or accounted for.
One plausible mechanistic explanation for such phenomena could be, for example, a result of host immune genes that rapidly evolve in a continuous arms race with members of its microbiome.

In animals 
Across the animal kingdom there are many notable examples of phylosymbiosis. For instance, in non-human primates it was found that host evolutionary history had a substantially greater influence on the gut microbiome than either host dietary niche or geographic location. It was speculated that changes in gut physiology within the evolutionary history of non-human primates was the primary reason. This finding was particularly interesting as it contradicted previous research which reported that dietary niche was a strong factor in determining the gut microbiome of mammals.

Plants 

phylosymbiosis has been reported in several plant groups including Malus and Poaceae. In the former case, Malus species, including wild wild and domesticated cultivars, harbored endophytic communities that corresponded to their phylogenetic relationship.

See also
 Microbial ecology
 Microbiome

References

Phylogenetics
Evolution
Metagenomics